The 2011 Calder Cup playoffs of the American Hockey League began on April 13, 2011. The sixteen teams that qualified, eight from each conference, played best-of-seven series for division semifinals, finals and conference finals. Then the Eastern Conference Champion Binghamton Senators defeated the Western Conference Champion Houston Aeros four games to two to win the Calder Cup, the first one in Binghamton franchise history.

Playoff seeds
After the 2010–11 AHL regular season, 16 teams qualified for the playoffs. The top eight teams from each conference qualified for the playoffs.

Eastern Conference

Atlantic Division
Portland Pirates – 103 points
Manchester Monarchs – 98 points
Connecticut Whale – 88 points

East Division
Wilkes-Barre/Scranton Penguins – 117 points
Hershey Bears – 100 points
Charlotte Checkers – 97 points
Norfolk Admirals – 93 points
Binghamton Senators – 92 points

Western Conference

North Division
Hamilton Bulldogs – 97 points
Lake Erie Monsters – 96 points
Manitoba Moose – 93 points

West Division
Milwaukee Admirals – 102 points
Houston Aeros – 98 points
Peoria Rivermen – 92 points (36 Regulation/Overtime Wins)
Texas Stars – 92 points (35 Regulation/Overtime Wins)
Oklahoma City Barons – 91 points

Bracket

In each round the team that earned more points during the regular season receives home ice advantage, meaning they receive the "extra" game on home-ice if the series reaches the maximum number of games. There is no set series format due to arena scheduling conflicts and travel considerations.

Division semifinals 
Note 1: All times are in Eastern Time (UTC-4).
Note 2: Game times in italics signify games to be played only if necessary.
Note 3: Home team is listed first.

Eastern Conference

Atlantic Division

(A1) Portland Pirates vs. (A3) Connecticut Whale

(A2) Manchester Monarchs vs. (E5) Binghamton Senators

East Division

(E1) Wilkes-Barre/Scranton Penguins vs. (E4) Norfolk Admirals

(E2) Hershey Bears vs. (E3) Charlotte Checkers

Western Conference

North Division

(N1) Hamilton Bulldogs vs. (W5) Oklahoma City Barons

(N2) Lake Erie Monsters vs. (N3) Manitoba Moose

West Division

(W1) Milwaukee Admirals vs. (W4) Texas Stars

(W2) Houston Aeros vs. (W3) Peoria Rivermen

Division finals

Eastern Conference

Atlantic Division

(A1) Portland Pirates vs. (E5) Binghamton Senators

East Division

(E1) Wilkes-Barre/Scranton Penguins vs. (E3) Charlotte Checkers

Western Conference

North Division

(N1) Hamilton Bulldogs vs. (N3) Manitoba Moose

West Division

(W1) Milwaukee Admirals vs. (W2) Houston Aeros

Conference finals

Eastern Conference

(E3) Charlotte Checkers vs. (E5) Binghamton Senators

Western Conference

(W2) Houston Aeros vs. (N1) Hamilton Bulldogs

Calder Cup finals

Binghamton Senators vs. Houston Aeros

Playoff statistical leaders

Leading skaters 

These are the top ten skaters based on points. If there is a tie in points, goals take precedence over assists.

GP = Games played; G = Goals; A = Assists; Pts = Points; +/– = Plus-minus; PIM = Penalty minutes

Leading goaltenders 

This is a combined table of the top five goaltenders based on goals against average and the top five goaltenders based on save percentage. The table is initially sorted by goals against average, with the criterion for inclusion in bold.

GP = Games played; W = Wins; L = Losses; SA = Shots against; GA = Goals against; GAA = Goals against average; SV% = Save percentage; SO = Shutouts; TOI = Time on ice (in minutes)

See also
2010–11 AHL season
List of AHL seasons

References

Calder Cup playoffs
Calder Cup